Sokulluzade Hasan Pasha (? - 1602) was an Ottoman officer.

He was the son of the Ottoman statesman Sokullu Mehmet Pasha. On 9 November 1571, he was appointed as the sanjak-bey of the Bosnia Eyalet. On 22 February 1572, he was appointed the beylerbey (governor) of Aleppo. On 31 January 1573, he became the governor of the Diyarbekir Eyalet, where he worked on providing oarsmen for the navy that was bound for Tunis and ammunition for a planned conquest of Bahrain, collection of tariffs and the elimination of the tribes that lived as brigands. He held this office until he was replaced by Özdemiroğlu Osman Pasha on 2 June 1576. It is not clear whether he ever became the governor of Erzurum.

He was the governor of the Damascus Eyalet in 1577. He was tasked with the defense of Erzurum in the Ottoman-Safavid War in 1578, but this mission was cancelled as the defense of Damascus was considered more important. He waited in Damascus until troops arrived from Egypt and moved to Erzurum, where the army gathered, in March 1579. He undertook the construction of one of the bastions of  the fortifications while he was in Kars. He then led a mission with the governors of Tbilisi and Diyarbekir to relieve Tbilisi of its shortage of supplies and food under the siege. He succeeded in this mission and returned to Damascus.

He later rejoined the army under Koca Sinan Pasha. On 18 October 1580, while he was in the frontline, he was made the governor of Diyarbekir again but the decision was swiftly reversed and he remained in his position in Damascus. While briefly sent to Baghdad on 14 November 1580, he remained the governor of Damascus and attended the circumcision feast of Prince Mehmed, future Sultan Mehmed III as such in 1582. In 1583, he rejoined the war against the Safavids under Serdar Ferhad Pasha, contributed to the conquest of Yerevan and the building of a new fort there. With the governors of Diyarbekir and Karaman, he helped catch Kara Veli, a brigand that attacked the army.

On 6 January 1584, he replaced Üveys Pasha as the governor of Aleppo.

References 
 

1602 deaths
Ottoman military officers
Ottoman governors of Damascus
Ottoman governors of Baghdad
Ottoman governors of Aleppo